Frank Francken (born 22 May 1964) is a Belgian former cyclist. He competed in the road race at the 1988 Summer Olympics.

References

External links
 

1964 births
Living people
Belgian male cyclists
Olympic cyclists of Belgium
Cyclists at the 1988 Summer Olympics
Sportspeople from Essen